1220 Crocus, provisionally designated , is a stony Eoan asteroid and slow rotator from the outer regions of the asteroid belt, approximately 17 kilometers in diameter. It was discovered on 11 February 1932, by German astronomer Karl Reinmuth at Heidelberg Observatory in southwest Germany.

Orbit and classification 

Crocus is a member of the Eos family, a collisional population of mostly stony composition. It orbits the Sun at a distance of 2.8–3.2 AU once every 5 years and 2 months (1,900 days). Its orbit has an eccentricity of 0.07 and an inclination of 11° with respect to the ecliptic.
A

Physical characteristics 

The asteroid has been characterized as a stony S-type asteroid.

In December 2014, a rotational lightcurve of Crocus was obtained from photometric observations by an international collaboration of several astronomers from Europe and the United States. Lightcurve analysis gave a long rotation period of 491 hours with a brightness variation of 1.00 magnitude.

Naming 

This minor planet was later named after the genus of flowering plants, Crocus, in the iris family.

References

External links 
 Asteroid Lightcurve Database (LCDB), query form (info )
 Dictionary of Minor Planet Names, Google books
 Asteroids and comets rotation curves, CdR – Observatoire de Genève, Raoul Behrend
 Discovery Circumstances: Numbered Minor Planets (1)-(5000) – Minor Planet Center
 
 

001220
Discoveries by Karl Wilhelm Reinmuth
Named minor planets
001220
19320211